February 23 - Eastern Orthodox liturgical calendar - February 25

All fixed commemorations below are observed on March 9  (March 8 on leap years) by Eastern Orthodox Churches on the Old Calendar.

For February 24th, Orthodox Churches on the Old Calendar commemorate the Saints listed on February 11.

Feast

 First (4th century) and Second (452) Findings of the Precious Head of St. John the Baptist.

Saints

 Saint John the Harvester (Theristos), of Calabria (9th century)

Pre-Schism Western saints

 Martyrs Montanus, Lucias, Julian, Victoricus, Flavian, and their companions, at Carthage (259)
 Saint Primitiva (Primitivus), an early martyr, probably in Rome.
 Saint Modestus, Bishop of Trier in Germany and Confessor (489)
 Saint Praetextatus (Prix), Bishop of Rouen in France and Martyr (586)
 Saint Liudhard (Letard), Chaplain and Bishop of Queen Bertha of Kent (c. 600)
 Saint Æthelberht of Kent, King of Kent (616)  (see also: February 25)
 Saint Boisil of Melrose Abbey (664)  (see also: February 23)
 Saint Cummain Ailbe (Cumine the White), Abbot of Iona (669)
 Saint Betto, a monk at Sainte Colombe in Sens in France, who became Bishop of Auxerre in 889 (918)

Post-Schism Orthodox saints

 Venerable Erasmus of the Kiev Caves Monastery (c. 1160)

Other commemorations

 Uncovering of the relics (1486) of St. Romanus, Prince of Uglich (1285)

Icon gallery

Notes

References

Sources
 February 24 / March 9. Orthodox Calendar (PRAVOSLAVIE.RU).
 March 9 / February 24. Holy Trinity Russian Orthodox Church (A parish of the Patriarchate of Moscow).
 February 24. OCA - The Lives of the Saints.
 The Autonomous Orthodox Metropolia of Western Europe and the Americas (ROCOR). St. Hilarion Calendar of Saints for the year of our Lord 2004. St. Hilarion Press (Austin, TX). p. 17.
 The Twenty-Fourth Day of the Month of February. Orthodoxy in China.
 February 24. Latin Saints of the Orthodox Patriarchate of Rome.
 The Roman Martyrology. Transl. by the Archbishop of Baltimore. Last Edition, According to the Copy Printed at Rome in 1914. Revised Edition, with the Imprimatur of His Eminence Cardinal Gibbons. Baltimore: John Murphy Company, 1916. pp. 57-58.
 Rev. Richard Stanton. A Menology of England and Wales, or, Brief Memorials of the Ancient British and English Saints Arranged According to the Calendar, Together with the Martyrs of the 16th and 17th Centuries. London: Burns & Oates, 1892. p. 83-84.
Greek Sources
 Great Synaxaristes:  24 ΦΕΒΡΟΥΑΡΙΟΥ. ΜΕΓΑΣ ΣΥΝΑΞΑΡΙΣΤΗΣ.
  Συναξαριστής. 24 Φεβρουαρίου. ECCLESIA.GR. (H ΕΚΚΛΗΣΙΑ ΤΗΣ ΕΛΛΑΔΟΣ). 
Russian Sources
  9 марта (24 февраля). Православная Энциклопедия под редакцией Патриарха Московского и всея Руси Кирилла (электронная версия). (Orthodox Encyclopedia - Pravenc.ru).
  24 февраля (ст.ст.) 9 марта 2014 (нов. ст.). Русская Православная Церковь Отдел внешних церковных связей. (DECR).

February in the Eastern Orthodox calendar